Lark Harbour is small fishing community on the western coast of Newfoundland, on the south side of the Bay of Islands, and west of the City of Corner Brook.

Combined with neighbouring York Harbour, there is a population of about 880. Blow Me Down Provincial Park lies on the boundary between the two communities.

Demographics 

See also
List of lighthouses in Canada

References

External links
 Aids to Navigation Canadian Coast Guard

Towns in Newfoundland and Labrador
Lighthouses in Newfoundland and Labrador
Fishing communities in Canada